In the United States, an Ethics Commission is a commission established by State law or county or city ordinance to investigate dishonest or unethical practices by public employees and elected officials.

See also
 California Fair Political Practices Commission
 Nevada Commission on Ethics
 New Mexico State Ethics Commission
 Oklahoma Ethics Commission
 Oregon Government Ethics Commission
 Pennsylvania State Ethics Commission
 San Francisco Ethics Commission
 Texas Ethics Commission
 Wisconsin Ethics Commission

Social ethics
Ethics organizations
Ethics commissions